Fienstedt is a village and a former municipality in the district Saalekreis, in Saxony-Anhalt, Germany. Since 1 January 2010, it is part of the municipality Salzatal.

Former municipalities in Saxony-Anhalt
Salzatal